"All My Love" is a song by Australian singer Renée Geyer. The song was released in 1985 as the lead single from Geyer's eighth studio album, Sing to Me (1985). It became Geyer's sixth top 40 single, peaking at number 28 on the Australian singles chart. Also available on 12" extended format at the time of release.

Track listing
 Australian 7" Single
Side A "All My Love" - 4:14
Side B "Guess Who I Saw Today" - 3:54

 Australian 12" Single
Side A "All My Love" (Extended Mix) - 6:10
Side B1 "Guess Who I Saw Today" - 3:54
Side B2 "All My Love" - 4:14

Charts

References

External links

Renée Geyer songs
1985 songs
1985 singles